Cantello is an Italian commune.

Cantello may also refer to:

 Mount Cantello, mountain in Victoria Land, Antarctica

People with the surname
 Al Cantello (b. 1933), American javelin thrower and track coach
 Len Cantello (b. 1951), English footballer